Ian Ray (born 28 August 1957) is a British former marathon runner who won the 1981 Berlin Marathon.

Career
Ray is from Salisbury, England. In 1979, Ray won the Southern Counties marathon championship in Harlow, in a time of 2:16:04. Ray won the 1981 Berlin Marathon in a time of 2:15:41. The top three in the race were all British, as were five of the top 10 finishers. The race was the first to be held in central West Berlin, and the finish line was in Kurfürstendamm near to the Kaiser Wilhelm Memorial Church. It was also the first Berlin Marathon with a cash prize for the winner. Ray was awarded 1000DM.

Ray was selected to represent England in the marathon event at the 1982 Commonwealth Games in Brisbane, Australia, after performing well at the AAA Championships. Ray came eighth in the race, in a time of 2:15:11. He was the second Englishman to finish, behind Mike Gratton. Ray also competed at the 1983 London Marathon.

References

External links
 ARRS

1957 births
Living people
British male marathon runners
Berlin Marathon male winners
Sportspeople from Salisbury
Athletes (track and field) at the 1982 Commonwealth Games
Commonwealth Games competitors for England